Chris Andrews (born 1962 in Newcastle, NSW) is an Australian translator and writer.

Andrews studied and then taught at the University of Melbourne before moving to the University of Western Sydney in 2009. In 2003 he published the first translation into English of the work of Roberto Bolaño. He was awarded the Valle-Inclán Prize in 2005 for his translation of Distant Star. In 2014 he published a monograph on Bolaňo. Andrews has also translated other Spanish-language literature, such as works by César Aira. Andrews has been keen to publish translations from French but has been unable to convince publishers to commission translations for work he likes.

Andrews has also published original poetry; his second collection of poems, Lime Green Chair, won the 2011 Anthony Hecht Poetry Prize.

Works

As author
Poetry and Cosmogony: Science in the Writing of Queneau and Ponge, Rodopi, 1999, 
Cut Lunch, Indigo, 2002, 
Lime Green Chair, Waywiser Press, 2012, 
Roberto Bolaño's Fiction: An Expanding Universe, Columbia University Press, 2014,

As translator
The Secret of Evil by Roberto Bolaño
The Insufferable Gaucho by Roberto Bolaño
The Return by Roberto Bolaño
Monsieur Pain by Roberto Bolaño
Nazi Literature in the Americas by Roberto Bolaño
Amulet by Roberto Bolaño
Distant Star by Roberto Bolaño
By Night in Chile by Roberto Bolaño
The Skating Rink by Roberto Bolaño
The Divorce by César Aira
Birthday by César Aira
The Linden Tree by César Aira
Ema, the Captive by César Aira
The Musical Brain by César Aira
Shantytown by César Aira
Varamo by César Aira
Ghosts by César Aira
How I Became a Nun by César Aira
An Episode in the Life of a Landscape Painter by César Aira

References

1962 births
Living people
Australian male writers
Australian translators
Spanish–English translators